Centroglossa is a genus of flowering plants from the orchid family, Orchidaceae. It contains 5 accepted species, all endemic to Brazil:

Centroglossa castellensis Brade - Espírito Santo
Centroglossa greeniana (Rchb.f.) Cogn. in C.F.P.von Martius - Rio de Janeiro, São Paulo
Centroglossa macroceras Barb.Rodr.
Centroglossa nunes-limae Porto & Brade - Minas Gerais, Espírito Santo
Centroglossa tripollinica (Barb.Rodr.) Barb.Rodr.

See also 
 List of Orchidaceae genera

References 

 Pridgeon, A.M., Cribb, P.J., Chase, M.A. & Rasmussen, F. eds. (1999). Genera Orchidacearum 1. Oxford Univ. Press.
 Pridgeon, A.M., Cribb, P.J., Chase, M.A. & Rasmussen, F. eds. (2001). Genera Orchidacearum 2. Oxford Univ. Press.
 Pridgeon, A.M., Cribb, P.J., Chase, M.A. & Rasmussen, F. eds. (2003). Genera Orchidacearum 3. Oxford Univ. Press
 Berg Pana, H. 2005. Handbuch der Orchideen-Namen. Dictionary of Orchid Names. Dizionario dei nomi delle orchidee. Ulmer, Stuttgart

External links 

Oncidiinae genera
Oncidiinae